Justice Dennis may refer to:

James L. Dennis (born 1936), associate justice of the Louisiana Supreme Court
Littleton Dennis Jr. (1765–1833), associate justice of the Maryland Court of Appeals

See also
Judge Dennis (disambiguation)